Independent Australian Jewish Voices (IAJV) is an Australian Jewish advocacy organisation. IAJV was launched on March 5, 2007 following the emergence of similar groups overseas in Britain (Independent Jewish Voices) and Germany (Schalom 5767), and earlier in the US (Jewish Voice for Peace), and Netherlands (Een Ander Joods Geluid).

Response 

Colin Rubenstein, executive director of the Australia/Israel & Jewish Affairs Council, described IAJV as "dangerous and unrepresentative" and said that "some of the individuals are clearly committed to the delegitimization of Israel."

IAJV's statement of principles states "that Israel's right to exist must be recognised and that Palestinians' right to a homeland must also be acknowledged"., IAJV says its search for peace in the Middle East represents a legitimate opinion "and should be met by reasoned argument rather than vilification and intimidation".

See also
Independent Jewish Voices (Canada)

References

External links 
 Independent Australian Jewish Voices

Arab–Israeli conflict
Jewish anti-occupation groups
Jewish political organizations
Jews and Judaism in Australia
Organizations established in 2007
Non-governmental organizations involved in the Israeli–Palestinian conflict
Non-governmental organizations involved in the Israeli–Palestinian peace process